Oenopota uschakovi is a species of sea snail, a marine gastropod mollusk in the family Mangeliidae.

Description
The length of the shell varies between 7 mm and 10.5 mm.

Distribution
This marine species occurs off the Far East Russia.

References

 Bogdanov, I. P. (1985). New Species of Gastropods of the Genus Oenopota (Gastropoda, Turridae) from the far-east Seas of the USSR; Zoologichesky Zhurnal, 64(3), 448–453.

External links
 

uschakovi
Gastropods described in 1985